Route 107 is a highway in northeastern Missouri.  Its northern terminus is at U.S. Route 24 southwest of Monroe City; its southern terminus is at Route 154 about nine miles (14 km) south of the northern terminus in Mark Twain State Park.  No towns are on the route, but the Mark Twain Birthplace State Historic Site is less than a mile to the east in Florida.  The highway crosses Mark Twain Lake twice.

Route description
Route 107 begins at an intersection with Route 154 south of Mark Twain State Park in Monroe County, where the roadway continues south as Route E. From the southern terminus, the route heads north as a two-lane undivided road, passing through wooded areas of Mark Twain State Park. The road crosses a part of Mark Twain Lake before leaving the state park and reaching an intersection with the eastern terminus of Route U. Route 107 continues northwest and crosses another portion of Mark Twain Lake prior to curving north again and passing through more woodland. The road heads to the northwest and runs through a mix of farm fields and wooded areas. Route 107 curves north and continues through agricultural areas before ending at US 24 southwest of Monroe City.

Major intersections

References

107
Transportation in Monroe County, Missouri